All Under One Banner Cymru (AUOB Cymru) is a Welsh grassroots movement which organises Welsh independence marches.

Activity

Founding 
The organisation was set up as a similar organisation and inspired by All Under One Banner in Scotland.

Their first march was held in Cardiff on 11 May 2019, attracting thousands of participants.

Marches and parades 
Initial marches and parades were held in Cardiff, Caernarfon and Merthyr Tydfil in May 2019.

Subsequent marches scheduled for 2020 had to be cancelled due to the COVID-19 pandemic.

AUOB announced they would be organising two independence marches in 2022. The first was held in Wrexham on 2 July. Thousands attended a march in Cardiff on 1 October.

See also

Wales 

 Welsh independence
 YesCymru
 List of movements in Wales
 Welsh Football Fans for Independence

Related movements 

 Scottish independence
 Yes Scotland
 United Ireland
 Ireland's Future
 English independence
 Potential breakup of the United Kingdom

 List of active separatist movements in Europe

References 

Welsh nationalism
Campaigns and movements in Wales
Political organisations based in Wales
Protest marches